Lake Whitney could be:

Lake Whitney (McLeod County, Minnesota)
Lake Whitney (Texas)
Lake Whitney Ranch
Lake Whitney (Connecticut)
Whitney Lake (New York)